Two ships of the Royal Navy have been named HMS Azalea :

  an  sloop launched in 1915 and sold in 1923
 , a  launched in 1940 and sold in 1946

Royal Navy ship names